Astrakhanka may refer to:
Astraxanka, Azerbaijan
Astrakhanka, former name of Cəlilabad, a city in Azerbaijan
Astrakhanka, Kazakhstan, a town in northern-central Kazakhstan. It is the seat of Astrakhan District in Akmola Province.
Astrakhanka, name of several rural localities in Russia.
a person from Astrakhan or Astrakhan Oblast

See also
Astrakhan (disambiguation)
Astrakhanovka (disambiguation)